Illya Cherednychenko (born 12 June 1995) is a Ukrainian footballer who plays as a winger for Polissya Zhytomyr.

Career
Cherednychenko made his professional league debut for Spartak Trnava on 28 July 2017 against Železiarne Podbrezová.

References

External links
FC Spartak Trnava official club profile
 
 
 Futbalnet profile

1995 births
Living people
Ukrainian footballers
Ukrainian expatriate footballers
Association football midfielders
FC Metalist Kharkiv players
FKM Nové Zámky players
FK Slovan Duslo Šaľa players
ŠKF Sereď players
FC Spartak Trnava players
FC Nitra players
FC Avanhard Bziv players
FC Hirnyk-Sport Horishni Plavni players
FC Polissya Zhytomyr players
3. Liga (Slovakia) players
Slovak Super Liga players
Ukrainian First League players
Expatriate footballers in Slovakia
Ukrainian expatriate sportspeople in Slovakia
Footballers from Kyiv